Rao Guohua (1894 – December 1, 1937) was a Sichuan clique Chinese general who was killed during the Second Sino-Japanese War.

1894 births
1937 deaths
Republic of China warlords from Sichuan
Military personnel killed in the Second Sino-Japanese War
Politicians from Ziyang